Abelardo Díaz Alfaro (July 24, 1916 – July 22, 1999) was a Puerto Rican author who achieved great fame throughout Latin America during the 1940s. His book Campo Alegre is a text that has been studied at schools in Austria, Australia, Canada, England, New Zealand as well as all over the Americas.

Life and career 
Díaz Alfaro was born in Caguas, Puerto Rico, but soon after his family moved to Ponce. He was the son of Abelardo Díaz Morales, a Baptist minister, and Asunción Alfaro Pratts (Doña Sunchita). His siblings were Abigail, Dalila, Miriam, Priscilla, Raquel, Lydia and Samuel. He returned to Caguas to attend University and married Gladys Meaux, with whom he had two daughters (Dalila and Nanette) and one son (Abelardo).

Díaz Alfaro obtained a bachelor's degree in arts at the Instituto Politécnico de San Germán, which is now known as Universidad Interamericana de Puerto Rico. He also obtained a title as a social worker, and certificates in Spanish and Psychology.

He obtained many honorary doctorates from different universities.

Some of his short stories, like "Peyo Mercé enseña inglés" or "Santa Cló va a la Cuchilla" (in Terrazo) create a Manichaean dichotomy between unlearned Puerto Rican peasants and American invaders (portrayed through the mandatory teaching of the English language in Puerto Rico). Thus, a praise of layman culture is expressed throughout his short stories. The metaphor of weak or feminine Americans versus uneducated but brave Puerto Ricans is taken later by other writers like Ana Lydia Vega.

He presented at conferences in many parts of Latin America after reaching fame, including in Mexico (at the Ateneo Español), Venezuela and many other countries. His books have been translated into English, Polish, Russian, German, French, Italian and Czech, among other languages.

Works
Among the books he wrote are:

 Terrazo (published in 1947)
 Mi Isla Soñada
 Los Perros
 The Eye of the Heart
 United States in Literature
 Classic Tales of Spanish America
 Cuentos del Mundo Hispano (Spanish version of Classic Tales)
 Changes Antología Mundial
 The Green Antilles
 Contemporary Readers
 National Catholic
 The Princeton Tiger
 Europe in France
 Campo Alegre.
Santa Clo va a la cuchilla (cuento)

See also

 List of Puerto Rican writers
 List of Puerto Ricans
 Puerto Rican literature

References

1916 births
1999 deaths
Burials at Santa María Magdalena de Pazzis Cemetery
Puerto Rican male short story writers
Puerto Rican short story writers
Puerto Rican male writers
People from Caguas, Puerto Rico
20th-century American male writers